Nay (also Romanized as Nāy) is a village in Qaleh-ye Bala Rural District, in the Farah Dasht District of Kashmar County, Razavi Khorasan Province, Iran. At the 2006 census, its population was 862, in 259 families.

References 

Populated places in Kashmar County